Aarón is the Spanish form of the Biblical name Aharon.

Notable people who are often referred to solely by this name include:
 Puerto Rican Pentecostal sect leader Teófilo Vargas Seín, who uses Aarón as his religious title
 Aarón Ñíguez (born 1989), Spanish professional footballer 
 Aarón (footballer) (born 1982), German-Spanish footballer

Other notable people with the given name of Aarón include: 
 Aarón Bueno Gómez (born 1983), Spanish footballer who plays for Gimnàstic de Tarragona

See also
Aaron (surname)

Spanish masculine given names